The 2021–22 V-League season was the 18th season of the V-League, the highest professional volleyball league in South Korea. The season ran from October 2021 to April 2022. Incheon Korean Air Jumbos were the defending champions for male teams and GS Caltex Seoul KIXX for the female teams. A new team, Gwangju AI Peppers joined the female league from this season.

Teams

Men's clubs

Women's clubs

Season standing procedure 
 Match points
 Number of matches won
 Sets ratio
 Points ratio
 Result of the last match between the tied teams

 If the 4th-placed team finishes within three points of the 3rd placed team, an extra league game is played between these two teams.

Match won 3–0 or 3–1: 3 match points for the winner, 0 match points for the loser
Match won 3–2: 2 match points for the winner, 1 match point for the loser

Regular season

League table (Men's) 

Source: League table (Men's)

As Suwon KEPCO finished within three points of Seoul Woori, a play-off was held between the two teams which Suwon won, advancing them to the semi-final play-off game.

League table (Women's) 

Source: League table (Women's)

Results / Fixtures - Male

Rounds 1 and 2 

(*) = game played at away team's ground

Rounds 3 and 4

Rounds 5 and 6 

(*) = game played at away team's ground

Results / Fixtures - Female

Rounds 1 and 2 

 = game played at away team's ground

Rounds 3 and 4 

 = game played at away team's ground

Rounds 5 and 6 

 = game played at away team's ground

Play-offs

Bracket (Men's ) 

The play-offs were shortened due to COVID, with the semi-final being a one-of game, and the finals reduced to as series of three. The women's play-offs were cancelled entirely and no winner crowned.

Attendance

Men's teams

Many games this season have had restricted attendance due to COVID protocols.

Women's teams

Most games this season have been closed door or restricted access.

Top Performers

Men's (Points)

Women's (Points)

Player of the Round

Men's

Women's

Final standing

Men's League

Women's League 

 Women's League postponed and then cancelled in Round 6 due to COVID cases.

References

V-League
V-League
V-League
V-League
V-League (South Korea)